Christos Maladenis (Greek: Χρήστος Μαλαδένης; born 23 May 1974) is a Greek former professional footballer who played as a midfielder. He is the current scouter of AEK Athens Academy.

Career
Maladenis began his career in Skoda Xanthi, attracting the interest of Panathinaikos and AEK Athens.

In the summer of 1995, he signed for AEK. Despite the injuries he had, he slowly made his presence felt, competing in many positions in the lineup, mainly in the midifield and offense. His best season was the period 1998–1999, where he scored 13 goals. He also played an incredible match against Iraklis in Kaftanzoglio Stadium, completing a hat-trick in AEK's victory with 2-3 which secured them in second place and sent them in next season's UEFA Champions League qualifiers. Maladenis also scored goal in the final of Greek Cup against Ionikos, which AEK won with 3–0. His best moment of his career was arguably the goal against Real Madrid in a Champions League game at Nikos Goumas Stadium on 2 October 2002. He played in AEK until 2003, where he won 4 cups and 1 Super Cup.

In December 2003 Maladenis was released and signed a deal with PAOK for three years. In 2007 Maladenis played for Levadiakos. He later played in  Panthrakikos and Trikala. From January 2009 he playd in Bulgarian side Vihren. He signed with the club from Sandanski on 8 January 2009 and has been given the number 7 shirt. Maladenis made his team debut a few days later, scoring in a 1–0 friendly win against Lokomotiv Plovdiv. He ended his professional career in 2010 at the amateur level in Iasmos Rodopis.

Career statistics
Last update: 12 April 2018

Honours

AEK Athens
Greek Cup: 1995–96, 1996–97, 1999–2000, 2001–02
Greek Super Cup: 1996

References

1974 births
Living people
Association football midfielders
Greek footballers
Greek expatriate footballers
AEK Athens F.C. players
AEK F.C. non-playing staff
PAOK FC players
OFC Vihren Sandanski players
Expatriate footballers in Bulgaria
Greek expatriates in Bulgaria
Super League Greece players
Super League Greece 2 players
First Professional Football League (Bulgaria) players
Trikala F.C. players
Footballers from Xanthi